Emma Grace Cole (January 10, 2016 – ) was an American murder and torture victim from Bloomington, Indiana whose burnt skeletal remains were discovered near a softball complex in Smyrna, Delaware on September 13, 2019. She remained unidentified for over a year and was known as "Baby Elle" and "Jane Smyrna Doe 2019" until her identification in October 2020. The killing has gained significant attention and media coverage due to the circumstances of Emma's death and her former status as an unidentified murder victim.

In October 2020 following Emma's identification, her mother, 28-year old Kristie Haas, and step-father, 38-year old Brandon Hass, were arrested in connection with her death and were charged with first-degree child abuse. In May 2021, they were re-indicted, with Kristie now facing first-degree murder charges. Their trial is scheduled for July 2023. If convicted, Kristie faces life imprisonment without the possibility of parole, while Brandon faces up to 44 years in prison.

Discovery of remains and investigation 
On September 13, 2019, the burnt skeletal remains of a female child were discovered by a dogwalker near a softball complex across from Smyrna Middle School in Smyrna, Delaware. It was estimated that her remains had been there for weeks at minimum. The identity of the remains was not initially determined. It had been estimated that the unidentified child was either Caucasian or Hispanic, between the ages of 2 to 5 years old, and had slightly wavy brown hair. The case garnered major attention in media and public discourse because of the child's status as an unidentified person and for the initial lack of suspects in the case. The unidentified child was nicknamed "Baby Elle" by law enforcement and the public until her identification. She did not match any missing person reports in the state.

Identification and arrests 
In October 2020, the child was identified as Emma Grace Cole, the 3-year old daughter of Kristie Lynn Haas (previously Kristie Lynn Cole) and Joshua Douthitt. Soon after, on October 12, Kristie and her husband, Brandon L. Hass were arrested on charges of child abuse. In May 2021, Kristie and Brandon were re-indicted, with Delaware Attorney General Kathy Jennings announcing that murder charges had been added for Kristie. Specific details of the abuse that Emma had endured were revealed, allegedly at the hands of Kristie and Brandon. According to the indictment, Emma was tortured by Kristie and Brandon for periods between January 2018 and September 2019. The indictment alleges that the couple deprived Emma of food, tortured her, endangered her welfare, deprived her of necessary medical care, bruised her face, forced her to exercise to an unreasonable level, inflicted inappropriate physical discipline, and burned her. Court records showed that Kristie had been in multiple custody battles between 2016 and 2017 over Emma with Emma's great-aunt and other family members. Kristie and Brandon had lived with Emma in both Indiana and Smyrna, Delaware. At the time of Emma's killing, the couple had lived a mile from the Little Lass softball fields where Emma's remains would end up being found.

The murder and abuse trial for Kristie and Brandon is currently scheduled for July 10, 2023.

Legacy 
The Little Lass softball field where Emma's remains were found was dedicated as the Emma Grace Memorial Field in November 2020.

Notes

References 

2019 in Delaware
2019 murders in the United States
September 2019 crimes in the United States
Deaths by person in Delaware
Incidents of violence against girls